The 2013 Conference USA baseball tournament was held from May 22 through 26 at Reckling Park in Houston, Texas.  The annual tournament determines the conference champion of the Division I Conference USA for college baseball.   won their fifth tournament championship and claimed the league's automatic bid to the 2013 NCAA Division I baseball tournament.  This is the last of 19 athletic championship events held by the conference in the 2012–13 academic year.

The tournament was established in 1996, Conference USA's first season of play.  Entering the event, Tulane has won the most championships, with five.  Among current teams, only Marshall and Memphis have never won a title.

This was to be the third year of a three-year contract placing the event at Trustmark Park, home of an Atlanta Braves Class-AA affiliate in Pearl, Mississippi, a suburb of Jackson, Mississippi.  However, the venue opted out of the contract, leaving Conference USA seeking a new home for the 2013 tournament.  The conference announced that the tournament would instead be held at Reckling Park.

Seeding and format
The tournament continued the round-robin tournament format introduced in 2010.  The top eight finishers from the regular season were seeded one through eight and divided into two pools.  The winners of each pool then met in a single championship game.

Bracket

All-Tournament Team
The following players were named to the All-Tournament Team.

Most Valuable Player
Christian Stringer was named Tournament MVP.  Stringer was an infielder for Rice who was 7–14 in the tournament for a .500 average with one RBI, one Stolen Base, and five runs scored.

References

Tournament
Conference USA Baseball Tournament
Conference USA baseball tournament
Conference USA baseball tournament
Conference USA baseball tournament
Baseball competitions in Houston
College sports tournaments in Texas